Anwar Chitayat (born August 21, 1927) is the founder and former CEO and chairman of Anorad Corp., which was acquired in 1998 by Rockwell Automation. Mr. Chitayat holds over 95 patents in Electronics, Semiconductors and Automation  including Nanotechnology, Interferometry and Linear motors. His achievements in High technology were honored by SEMI (year 2000) at their highest honor for Lifetime Achievement, reserved for individuals who repeatedly enable and lead the technology industry throughout their professional career. In the year 1997, Anwar was awarded the Entrepreneur of the year award by Ernst and Young, and in the year 2009, Anwar was inducted to Long Island Hall of Fame for his impacts on science and technology on Long Island.

Anwar's innovative discoveries in Linear motor Technology and its High performance positioning systems  applications attracted global interest from hundreds of industrial technology manufacturers, including major Fortune 500 companies. Ford Motor Company held 10% shares at Anorad to promote their "Factory of the Future" with High Velocity Machine Tools (HVM), which was followed up by Chrysler.  Companies such as IBM, Motorola, Applied Materials, and KLA Tencor have also used Anorad's tools to improve their factory automation technology in Semiconductor fabrication plants.  Products such as Anorad's brushless linear motors enabled them to produce products faster at higher precision.

Today, brushless linear motor products are being manufactured globally by tens of companies and being used in hundreds of thousands of types of high-performance automation process equipment, including Semiconductors, Electronics, Optical instruments, Machine tools, Automotive, Aerospace, Metrology, Drug discovery and general Automation industries.

Education
 B.Sc. Mechanical Engineering, University of Denver
 B.Sc. Electrical Engineering, University of Denver 
 M.Sc. Electrical Engineering, Polytechnic Institute of Brooklyn, (now Polytechnic Institute of New York University)

Engineering leadership career

Anorad 
Anwar founded the Anorad Corporation in 1972 in his basement in Plainview, Long Island. He borrowed $20,000 from relatives and set up shop with a staff of two: his partner Stanley Squires and Secretary Yolanda Schweers. He told his wife and two children that they would “have a rough time with money, and may not get new shoes for a while.” Anorad is an acronym that stands for "Anwar’s Own Research And Development”.  The company's revenues doubled almost every year, and grew to a 500-person international company with 4 plants in Hauppauge, New York Long Island and divisions in Italy, Netherland, Israel & Japan.

Leadership style 
Anwar possessed an extraordinary ability to understand and solve a broad spectrum of industrial-automation problems related to various combinations of high-speed and high-precision manufacturing processes. Anwar's vision directed him to innovative Electro-optics machine solutions that met customers' rigorous requirements. His common-sense style of explaining his solutions inspired customers to get on board even when doing so meant taking risks.

Anwar's leadership style with his employees was similarly straightforward and tough, yet fair and patient. While Anwar expected his engineers to perform at their best, and provided critical feedback when they did not meet his standards, he always communicated in an educational style without raising his voice.

Anwar believed that the company owed its success to employees’ ingenuity, loyalty and hard work. He instituted a stock option plan that gave 20% of its stock to employees. Years later, most employees said that if Anwar wanted to start a new company, they would be delighted to work for him again. Anorad supported employment of employees’ family members and there were at times three generations of families working there, and employees who stated that their years at Anorad were the best years of their lives.

Anorad's reputation among customers 
The following typifies Anorad's relationships with its customers: When FANUC, one of the world's largest CNC manufacturers, decided to license linear motor technology after observing automotive transfer line demonstrations, they contacted four potential suppliers from among prominent engineering firms around the world. FANUC meticulously researched these suppliers' patents and concluded that Anorad, with over 50 related patents, was the best company for the challenge.  Dr. Seiuemon Inaba, FANUC's legendary founder and CEO, visited Anorad with several members of his team. The visit included a plant tour focusing on multiple high-performance positioning systems on the shop floor. Each of these systems was already in operation; the engineer in charge of each explained its construction and performance. These explanations and the discussions that followed were translated into Japanese for the visitors. A few weeks later a message from Dr. Inaba reached Chitayat: "We are pleased to inform you that we have decided to team up with Anorad in linear motor technology licensing. We found that your patents are strong but more than that, I have never seen a company where so many employees expressed so much enthusiasm for their work. Therefore I am sure that if we do business with you, we will not go wrong." FANUC next invited Mr. Chitayat to make a VIP visit to its headquarters in order to sign the contract. The signing ceremony took place in a beautiful setting overlooking Mount Fuji. Japanese media covered the event extensively.

Honorary recognitions

Hall of Fame (EY) Entrepreneur Of The Year
"Anwar Chitayat, Anorad Corporation, 1997 Technology Award Winner" "For three decades EY and the Entrepreneur Of The Year awards have honored entrepreneurial men and women and the companies they build and grow."

Year 2000 SEMI Award North America
"Anwar Chitayat, Innovator and Developer of the Brushless Linear Motor, Enabling Equipment" 

"The highest honor achievable through the 2,000-member trade organization SEMI is the Lifetime Achievement Award. The Honor is reserved for those individuals who repeatedly enable and lead the industry, technologically, throughout their professional career in developing new and emerging technologies expected to have significant future value to the semiconductor industry."

US Department of Commerce
Nominated for the 1998 Regional Medal of Technology, sponsored by the US Department of Commerce

Hauppauge Industrial Association 
Awarded Business Achievement Award

Pulp & PaperCanada Announcement 
"Anwar Chitayat, founder and former chief executive officer of Milwaukee, WI-based Anorad Corp., a Rockwell Automation business unit, has been awarded the 2000 SEMI Award for Enabling Equipment. The award is given to people who have made significant technical contributions to the semiconductor industry."

Year 2009 Long Island Technology Hall of Fame 
"The objectives of the Long Island Technology Hall of Fame are to recognize, honor and preserve the contributions, exceptional accomplishments, and dedication of historical figures or current leaders in science or technology who have had, or are having, an impact on Long Island."

Notable patents and discoveries

Anwar's 95 patents span the years of 1962 to 2019 (patent numbers 3,024,699 and 10,654,174 respectively). His patents are diversified and cover technologies including optical systems, daylight star trackers, satellite trackers, interferometry devices, fiber optics imaging, sensors, machine tools, linear motors, positioning tables, robotics, air bearing motion systems, guns for tie wrapping, laser markers, and measuring machines.

High speed with high precision manufacturing
Anwar's discoveries in Linear Motor Technology  and its high performance positioning systems applications attracted global interest from hundreds of industrial technology manufacturers, including Fortune 500 companies. Products such as Anorad's brushless linear motors enabled them to produce products faster at higher precision. More than thirty of Anwar's patents in this field contributed to high speed and low cost manufacturing, which allowed the mass production of computers, phones and other electronic products.

Today, brushless linear motor products are being manufactured globally by tens of companies and  used in hundreds of thousands of types of high-performance automation process equipment, including semiconductors, electronics, optical instruments, machine tools, automotive, aerospace, metrology, drug discovery and general automation industries.

Nanotechnology and laser interferometers
Anwar held more than thirty patents in the field of measurement and manufacturing of very small components and geometries, including those as small as a nanometer (10−9 meter). The small size required the development of new technologies using Interferometry for measurement, nano positioning motors, and stages. The Interferometer manufactured and measured semiconductors by using the wavelength of light as a measuring stick. Length and angles were measured with small fractions of laser light waves. 

Anwar was working on nanotechnology since the 1960s, when this kind of small devices had no practical value. Later on, they were needed for the manufacture of microprocessors and semiconductors, and now they serve as a basis of computers, phones and other electronic products

Fiber optics 
Anwar was awarded 4 patents for use of fiber optics for imaging, including techniques for image enhancement. One of these systems was used in the Apollo Program (manned trips to the moon) to monitor the rocket engines. The optical lenses were placed in the very hot environment of the rocket, and the fiber optics transmitted the images remotely to the human monitors and camera.

Satellite and star trackers 
Anwar's first invention was a light modulating scanner   which enabled Kollsman Instruments to manufacture a star tracking system to be used in moonlit conditions, twilight, and daylight. This daylight star tracker  was used to navigate airplanes and ships to determine their precise location, by using the latitude and longitude of the stars. This system is now obsolete due to the introduction of GPS.

Anorad also developed scanning techniques to track satellites, for which Anwar obtained other patents.

Notable Anorad equipment 

Anorad Corporation (majority-owned by Anwar) was renowned to be a state-of-the-art company in the field of high speed & high accuracy systems. Some large companies such as Ford Motor Company, Gidding and Lewis, International Paper, Hughes Aircraft Company, and Kulike and Sofa used Anorad linear motors and motion systems for high speed and high accuracy machines.   Large electronic manufacturers including IBM, Motorola, Intel, and Orbotec used the high accuracy and nanotechnology developed by Anorad for their automated high speed, high precision machines for assembly and production of semiconductors and electronic devices.    Anorad had the unique capability of designing and manufacturing complete machines at Anorad factories due to a large machine shop, program managers, designers, programmers, human resources, and purchasing staff.

Cardiac stents
An example of Anorad's contribution to our society is its role in the discovery and development of cardio stents. Around 1990, doctors from Advanced Cardiovascular Systems Inc. arrived at Anorad to determine whether Anorad could enable them to produce their Coronary stent invention. Their concept was to manufacture a very small cylindrical tube that could be inserted into patient veins to unblock the flow of blood. The small cylinder contained an inner balloon that would expand by releasing compressed air to allow the blood to flow easily. The difficulty was in manufacturing a very small cylinder designed to collapse to a small size and later expand to a larger size and remain locked in this open state. The manufacture of this type of product was extremely difficult due the very small geometries that are involved. Anwar suggested the use of a CNC (Computerized Numerical Controlled Machine) designed specially by Anorad. This machine used High performance positioning system including a motorized rotary stage and X-Y-Z positioning stages . A laser was used to focus the laser beam on the surface of the cylinder, while the cylinder was rotated & moved to generate the shapes that were proposed by the doctors. This CNC machine was then manufactured by Anorad and used to produce stents that saved many lives. The company Advanced Cardiovascular Systems Inc (now Eli Lilly), obtained several patents which acknowledged the use of the Anorad machines to produce their stents.

Watching over “We the People”
Anorad was assigned to build a positioning system and a digital scanner to help preserve US historical documents: The Constitution, Declaration of Independence, and the Bill of Rights. A Newsday article from Sept 14, 1987 by Paul Schreiber states,
 "One hundred years from now, if the republic endures that long, Anwar Chitayat’s contribution to the history of the United States could still be humming along. ‘Oh, hell yes,’ says Chitayat, ‘there is no reason why this machine 
 won’t last that long.’ The machine made by Anorad... is the bedrock of a unique new system that is a blend of computer and space technology." "For at least the next 50 years, this $3.3 million system is to help the National Archives watch over the priceless treasures of our founding. These are the documents - especially the seven oversize pages of the Constitution of the United States, United States Declaration of Independence & United States Bill of Rights - that have taken a pounding until relatively recently... They now repose in the reverential rotunda of the National Archives in Washington." "The documents are softly lit, sealed in cases full of soothing Helium and the right trace of moisture, shielded by day by bullet-proof glass and lowered into subterranean vault every evening. ...By 1984, the Laboratory      hired Perkin Elmer, ... It turned to Vicom, a computer company, and Anorad for major components. ...The system records more than a million picture elements in a square inch. The archives will re-examine the same spots every seven years and sound the alarm if there is even the slightest change." ''

Family life

Personal 

Anwar was born August 21, 1927, in Baghdad Iraq and raised with six brothers and sisters in a low-income household. At the age of 16, he obtained the highest score in Iraq in its final exam, which was given to all high schools each year. He was awarded a scholarship to come to the US to study Mechanical Engineering. He obtained two simultaneous B.Sc. degrees in Electrical and Mechanical Engineering from the University of Denver in 1951. He also obtained an M.Sc. in Electrical Engineering from the Polytechnic Institute of Brooklyn in 1952, now New York University Tandon School of Engineering. In 1952, Anwar joined the US Army for two years and was stationed in Alaska where he serviced the US Due Line. Anwar became a US citizen shortly after leaving the US Army.

Anwar was married three times. He has two daughters with his first wife Deanna: Mara and Aimee. Deanna Chitayat holds a PhD in Experimental Psychology and served as a Dean of Hofstra University. He also has three children with his second wife Constance: Duri, Adrienne, and Olivia. Constance Chitayat graduated from Boston College with a B.A. in History, Boston University with a M.S. Journalism, and holds a certificate in Forensic Accounting from New York University.

After the acquisition of Anorad by Rockwell Automation Anwar married Ann, a real estate broker and owner of 4 Town Real Estates. Anwar and Ann initially lived in Fort Salonga, New York before moving to Florida, where they joined the Polo Country Club in a semi-retired community. His hobbies include traveling, tennis, dancing, dining, and socializing with friends over a martini and a game of Backgammon or Texas Hold'em.

Family 
Anwar's father, Khadoory Chitayat, was a legal documentary writer. His mother, Khatoon Aboody, graduated from Alliance française school and spoke four languages (Arabic, French, English, and Hebrew). His mother emphasized the need for education to survive, as life was difficult in Baghdad. She drove Anwar and his brothers to excel “no matter what”.  In 1950, the Iraqi government revoked the citizenship of those of the Jewish faith, including the Chitayats, when Israel was formed as a nation. While Anwar remained in Denver, his family was  airlifted to Israel via Cyprus, in accordance with an agreement between Arab countries and Israel. Consequently, the Iraqi government discontinued Anwar's scholarship and instructed Anwar to return to Iraq and pay back his scholarship. Anwar applied to stay in the US and was accepted to remain as a displaced persons. He was able to afford to finish his engineering degrees by working part time at Denver University.

In 1950, Anwar's father was asked by Iraq to pay back the money spent on Anwar's scholarship. He did not have the resources and was put in jail. He then escaped on foot to Basra, the southern city of Iraq, where he crossed the border to Iran. In order to go to Syria from Iran, he crossed the border with a woman and two children, who were disguised as his family. From Syria, he crossed to Israel to join his family.

In Israel, life for the family was initially very difficult.  They lived in dilapidated tents for a long time, and were less valued by society due to their country of origin. However their status changed over several years. His sisters went to a Kibbutz for a time, the brothers went to the Israeli Army, and all learned the Hebrew language and assimilated in Israel in Ramat Gan.

Later on, all his brothers became successful entrepreneurs. Abraham, Anwar's older brother, finished his education in England and managed factories in Hong Kong. His younger brother Zvi moved with his family to Tokyo where he established the Pearl company. Anwar's youngest brother Eli found a company in Taiwan and stayed there for several years. All Anwar's siblings now reside in Israel with their extended families.

Sources
1. 
2. 
3.
4.Chitayat, Anwar (May 18, 1998). "Linear Motors Come Into Their Own" Design News 
5.Chitayat, Anwar ( Volume 11,1987) " Linear Motors Provide Fast and Precise Motion" official proceedings of the international motor conference 
6.Chitayat, Anwar (July 3–5, 1994). "Nanometer X-Y positioning states for scanning and stepping" Proceedings Of The International Symposium On Manufacturing 
7.Chitayat, Anwar (March 6–12, 2009) "Long Island technology hall of fame" Long Island Business News 
8.Paul Schreiber (September 14, 1967) "Watching Over We The People" Newsday 
9.Brown, Stewart F (November 25, 1996) "The Fast New World Of Flat Motors" Fortune 
10.

References 

Chief executives in the technology industry
Living people
1927 births
Iraqi Jews